The 2014 Shell and Pennzoil Grand Prix of Houston was the second doubleheader of the 2014 season, hosting Rounds 9 and 10 of the 2014 IndyCar Series season. Carlos Huertas won Race 1, and Simon Pagenaud won the second race.

Classification

References

2014 in IndyCar
2014 in sports in Texas
June 2014 sports events in the United States